John Neilson (July 17, 1776 – February 1, 1848) was a Scots-Quebecer editor of the newspaper La Gazette de Québec/The Quebec Gazette and a politician.

Biography 
 Born in Dornal, Scotland, Neilson arrived in Quebec City, Lower Canada in 1791 to work for his uncle's printing company, which he inherited in 1793. Elected to the Legislative Assembly of Lower Canada in a bye-election in 1818, he was re-elected until 1830 and supported the Parti canadien. In 1823, he accompanied Louis-Joseph Papineau to London to lobby against the Union project in the name of the majority of the MPs in the Legislative Assembly of Lower Canada. Again, in 1828 he was part of a delegation sent to London to present his party's demands for reform. In 1830, he took his distance from the Parti patriote, which he considered to be too radical. He opposed the Ninety-Two Resolutions of 1834, a rewrite of the 1828 demands for reform with a radical tone. In 1837, he was named to the Executive Council and Legislative Council. Neilson was a member of the Special Council that administered Lower Canada after the Lower Canada Rebellion.

Neilson opposed the Union after its enactment. In 1841, he was elected to the 1st Parliament of the Province of Canada in the riding of Quebec County. He was elected speaker, but in 1844, he was appointed to the Legislative Council.

John Neilson is one of the major characters in the 3-volume series, A Chronicle of Lower Canada, which relates the events leading up to the Lower Canada Rebellion in 1837.

Neilson died at Cap-Rouge in 1848.

There is a street named after him in Saint-Gabriel-de-Valcartier, Quebec.

Works 
 Aux electeurs du comté de Quebec/To the Electors of the County of Quebec, 1820
 Letter from L.J. Papineau and J. Neilson, Esqs., Addressed to His Majesty's Under Secretary of State on the Subject of the Proposed Union of the Provinces of Upper and Lower Canada., 1823 (online)
 Report of the Special Committee of the House of Assembly of Lower-Canada, on the Petitions Against the Road Laws and the Office of Grand-Voyer, 1830
 Rapport du Comité spécial de la Chambre d'assemblée sur le Département du bureau de la poste dans la province du Bas-Canada, 1831
 Report of the Commissioners Appointed under the Lower Canada Act, 4th William IV. cap. 10, to Visit the United States' Penitentiaries, 1835
 First report. The Select Committee Appointed to Investigate and Report on the Outrages Alleged to Have Been Committed at the General Election in the Counties of Terrebonne, Montreal, Vaudreuil, Beauharnois, Chambly and Rouville, 1843

Family information
Sons:
 Samuel Neilson (1800-1837)
 William Neilson (1805-1895) married Margaret Cassin
 John Jr. Neilson (1820-1896) married Laura Moorehead

Daughters:
 Isabel Neilson (1798-1873)
 Mary Neilson married notary Thomas Lee
 Elisabeth Neilson (1804-1804)
 Margaret Neilson (1808-1894)
 Janet Neilson (1810-?)
 Agnes Janet Neilson (1815-1837)
 Frances Neilson (1815-?)

One of his granddaughters, Isabel Neilson married Charles Stuart Wolff, the son of Lt. Col. Alexander Joseph Wolff, a British soldier who was established in Valcartier, Canada in 1824.

Notes

References 
 
 Tomlinson, James (1972). L'imprimerie Neilson, Montréal: Université de Montréal, 23 p.
 Audet, Francis-Joseph. "John Neilson", in Mémoires de la société Royale du Canada. Troisième Série; Vol. XXII, Ottawa, 1928, p. 81-97

See also
Timeline of Quebec history
Lower Canada Rebellion

1776 births
1848 deaths
Canadian Presbyterians
Members of the Legislative Assembly of Lower Canada
Members of the Legislative Council of Lower Canada
Members of the Special Council of Lower Canada
Members of the Legislative Assembly of the Province of Canada from Canada East
Members of the Legislative Council of the Province of Canada
People from Quebec City
Scottish emigrants to pre-Confederation Quebec
Anglophone Quebec people
Persons of National Historic Significance (Canada)
Immigrants to Lower Canada